The 2022–23 EHF European League group stage was played between 25 October 2022 and 28 February 2023 to determine the twelve teams advancing to the knockout stage of the 2022–23 EHF European League.

Draw
The draw was held on 6 October 2022 in Vienna, Austria.

Seeding
The 24 teams were divided into six pots of four teams, with a team from each pot being drawn to each group. Teams from the same country could not be drawn into the same group. The draw was held in EHF office in Vienna.

Format
In each group, teams played against each other in a double round-robin format, with home and away matches.

Tiebreakers
In the group stage, teams were ranked according to points (2 points for a win, 1 point for a draw, 0 points for a loss), and if tied on points, the following tiebreaking criteria were applied, in the order given, to determine the rankings:
Points in matches among tied teams;
Goal difference in matches among tied teams;
Goal difference in all group matches;
Goals scored in all group matches;
If more than two teams were tied, and after applying all head-to-head criteria above, a subset of teams were still tied, all head-to-head criteria above were reapplied exclusively to this subset of teams;
Drawing lots.

Groups
The matchdays were 25 October, 1 November, 22 November, 29 November, 6 December, 13 December 2022, 7 February, 14 February, 21 February, and 28 February 2023.

Times until 29 October 2022 were UTC+2, from 30 October 2022 on UTC+1.

Group A

Group B

Group C

Group D

Notes

References

External links
Official website

2022–23 EHF European League